2MASS J02431371−2453298 (abbreviated to 2MASS 0243−2453) is a brown dwarf of spectral class T6, located in the constellation Fornax about 34.84 light-years from Earth.

Discovery
2MASS 0243−2453 was discovered in 2002 by Adam J. Burgasser et al. from Two Micron All-Sky Survey (2MASS), conducted from 1997 to 2001. Follow-up observations were made in 1998–2001 using the Near-Infrared Camera, mounted on the Palomar 60 inch (1.5 m) Telescope; CTIO Infrared Imager (CIRIM) and Ohio State Infrared Imager/Spectrometer (OSIRIS), mounted on the Cerro Tololo Inter-American Observatory (CTIO) 1.5 m Telescope; and some additional observations were made using the Near Infrared Camera (NIRC), mounted on the Keck I 10 m telescope, and nearinfrared camera D78, mounted on the Palomar 5 m Hale Telescope. In 2002 Burgasser et al. published a paper, where they defined new spectral subtypes T1—T8, and presented discovery of 11 new T-type brown dwarfs, among which also was 2MASS 0243-2453. These 11 objects were among the earliest T-type brown dwarfs ever discovered: before this, the total number of known T-type objects was 13, and the discoveries increased it up to 24 (apart from additional T-type dwarfs, identified by Geballe et al. 2001 in SDSS data).

Distance

2MASS J02431371−2453298 distance estimates

Space motion
Position of 2MASS 0243-2453 shifts due to its proper motion by 0.3548 arcseconds per year.

Properties
Using an evolutionary model, the surface temperature of 2MASS 0243−2453 is estimated to be 1040–1100 K, and its mass is estimated at 2.4–4.1% that of the Sun, its diameter 0.092 to 0.106 that of the Sun, and age 0.4–1.7 billion years.

As with other brown dwarfs of spectral type T, its spectrum is dominated of methane. Like mant of other T-class brown dwarf, 2MASS J0243−2453 does not exhibit any optical variability, indicating its upper atmosphere is free of clouds.

See also
The other 10 brown dwarfs, presented in Burgasser et al. (2002):
2MASS 0415−0935 (T8)
2MASS 0727+1710 (T7)
2MASS 0755+2212 (T5)
2MASS 0937+2931 (T6)
2MASS 1534−2952 (T5.5)
2MASS 1546-3325 (T5.5)
2MASS 1553+1532 (T7)
2MASS 2254+3123 (T5)
2MASS 2339+1352 (T5.5)
2MASS 2356−1553 (T6)

References

External links
Entry at DwarfArchives.org 

Fornax (constellation)
Brown dwarfs
T-type stars
J02431371−2453298
Astronomical objects discovered in 2002